The Pawl Kut is a festival of Mizoram held in December in India. Pawl means "Straw" hence pawl kut means a straw harvest festival. It is typically celebrated in December for two days after harvest and an important festival. It is one of the main festivals of the people of Mizoram, being a post-harvest festival. This is a festival observed in December for two days.

Origin
The origin of Pawl Kut dates back to a period when people of Mizoram used to live near the River Tiau around 1450 to 1700 AD. A severe famine occurred for three continuous years. On the fourth year, there was a bumper crop. Thus people celebrate Pawl Kut as an act of thanksgiving to the Almighty for giving a bountiful harvest.

Celebration 
Meat and egg form a customary part of the feast for the festival. A ritual known as Chawnghnawt is observed during the festival. During Chawnghnawt ritual mother and her children are made to sit on a memorial platform constructed specially for the purpose of Pawl Kut. The mother feeds her children with meat and eggs, and her children in turn feed their mother with eggs and meat.

References

Festivals in Mizoram
Harvest festivals in India
Food and drink festivals in India